Maurus Reinkowski (born 1962) is a historian of the Ottoman Empire and Professor of Islamic and Middle Eastern Studies at the University of Basel.

Works 

Maurus Reinkowski, Düzenin Şeyleri, Tanzimat'ın Kelimeleri: 19. Yüzyıl Osmanlı Reform Politikasının Karşılaştırmalı Bir Araştırması, Çeviren: Çiğdem Canan Dikmen, İstanbul: Yapı Kredi Yayınları, 2017, 351 shf.,

References

1962 births
Scholars of Ottoman history
20th-century German historians
21st-century German historians
Academic staff of the University of Basel
Living people